Sarcodon wrightii is a species of tooth fungus in the family Bankeraceae. It was first described in 1860 by Miles Berkeley and Moses Ashley Curtis as Hydnum wrightii. They were sent a specimen collected from Japan as part of the North Pacific Exploring and Surveying Expedition (1853–56). Rudolph Arnold Maas Geesteranus transferred it to the genus Sarcodon in 1967. The fungus produces roughly spherical spores that are tuberculate (covered in warts) and measure 5.5–6.5 by 4.5–5.5 μm.

References

External links

Fungi described in 1860
Fungi of Japan
wrightii
Taxa named by Miles Joseph Berkeley